Plato's Problem is the term given by Noam Chomsky to "the problem of explaining how we can know so much" given our limited experience. Chomsky believes that Plato asked (using modern terms) how we should account for the rich, intrinsic, common structure of human cognition, when it seems underdetermined by extrinsic evidence presented to a person during human development. In linguistics this is referred to as the "argument from poverty of the stimulus" (APS). Such arguments are common in the natural sciences, where a developing theory is always "underdetermined by evidence". Chomsky's approach to Plato's Problem involves treating cognition as a normal research topic in the natural sciences, so cognition can be studied to elucidate intertwined genetic, developmental, and biophysical factors. Plato's Problem is most clearly illustrated in the Meno dialogue, in which Socrates demonstrates that an uneducated boy nevertheless understands geometric principles.

Introduction
What is knowledge? What is experience? How do they interact? Is there a correlational, causal, or reciprocal relationship between knowledge and experience? These and other related questions have been at the forefront of investigation by problem solvers, scientists, psychologists, and philosophers for centuries. These questions, but particularly the problem of how experience and knowledge interrelate, have broad theoretical and practical implications for such academic disciplines as epistemology, linguistics, and psychology (specifically the subdiscipline of thinking and problem solving). Gaining a more precise understanding of human knowledge, whether defined as innate, experiential, or both, is an important part of effective problem solving.

Plato was the first philosopher who systematically inquired into issues such as those noted above. He wrote many dialogues, such as Euthyphro and the Apology, but it is from the Meno that the modern instantiation of Plato's Problem is derived. In the Meno, Plato theorizes about the relationship between knowledge and experience and provides an explanation for how it is possible to know something that one has never been explicitly taught. Plato believed that we possess innate ideas that precede any knowledge that we gain through experience.

As formulated by Noam Chomsky, accounting for this gap between knowledge and experience is "Plato's Problem". The phrase has a specific linguistic context with regard to language acquisition but can also be used more generally.

Plato (427 B.C. – 347 B.C.)

Early work
Plato's early philosophical endeavors involved dialogues discussing many ideas, such as the differences between knowledge and opinion, particulars and universals, and God and man. These early dialogues do not utilize conventional notions of reason. Rather, they appeal to the emotions, the allegorical, the spiritual, and the mythological interests of an ancient speculative mind.

Controversy surrounds the early dialogues in how they are to be interpreted. Some claim that Plato was truly trying to discover objective reality through these mystical speculations while others maintain that the dialogues are stories to be interpreted only as parables, allegories, and emotional appeals to religious experience. Regardless, Plato would come to formulate a more rigorous and comprehensive philosophy later in his life, one that reverberates in contemporary Western thought to this day.

Some of Plato's famous works are Phaedo, the Crito, and, as noted earlier, the Meno. Within these works are found a comprehensive philosophy that addresses epistemology, metaphysics, ethics, aesthetics, theology, and logic. As noted, most of the writing is in the form of dialogues and arguments to pursue answers to difficult questions and concepts. Plato's teacher and mentor, Socrates, always plays a significant and formative role in these dialogues.

Socrates (470 B.C. – 399 B.C.)

Most of Plato's philosophical ideas were communicated through his beloved teacher Socrates as a presence in the dialogues. Though there are no extant writings of Socrates known, it is evident through Plato's works that Socrates had an incredible ability to explore the most intense analytical discussions. However, for some there is controversy regarding how much historical fact can be derived from Plato's Socrates (Russell). Some doubt Socrates ever existed. Others are skeptical as to the accuracy of some of Plato's dialogues but nonetheless maintain that we can learn a substantial amount of historical information about Socrates from the dialogues. Still others take practically everything Plato wrote about Socrates as veridical history. Regardless, it may be safe to say that Plato never meant to record Socrates verbatim and it may plausibly be concluded that his general ideas were communicated in the dialogues.

Socratic method
As delineated in various writings, the meticulousness, articulation, and sophistication with which Socrates spoke supplies an outstanding problem solving technique – the Socratic Method. The Socratic method may be described as follows: it usually involves others with whom Socrates directly engages (not merely pontificating to an audience), it involves a deep philosophical or ethical question to which an answer was sought, and it usually involves Socrates asking questions either to affirm his understanding of others or to seek their understanding.

If someone disagreed with him, Socrates would execute this process in order to bring about his interlocutor's reluctant admission of inconsistencies and contradictions. Either Socrates would ask his debators questions about their claims that would lead them to admit their fallacy or Socrates would answer questions by posing questions meant to lead the other to answer their own query.

Meno
One such dialogue of Plato's that utilized the Socratic Method was the Meno. The participants were Socrates, Meno, Anytus, and one of Meno's slave boys. The dialogue begins with Meno asking Socrates whether virtue can be taught. Socrates responds by stating that he does not know the definition of virtue. Meno replies by stating the characteristics of a virtuous man, to which Socrates responds that the characteristics of a virtuous man may be the by-products of virtuousness but they by no means define virtue. Meno is obliged to agree; to wit, he tries to modify his explanation of virtue. Socrates counters each attempt by pointing to inconsistencies and circular arguments.

Meno seems to commit two fallacies when trying to define virtue. He either defines it using some form of the word itself, or he defines it using other words that call for definitions and explanations themselves. Eventually, Meno is led to confess his shortcomings as he tries to define the enigmatic term (the Socratic method is the mechanism that brings about this confession). Socrates claims that a definition of virtue must consist of common terms and concepts that are clearly understood by those in the discussion.

A crucial point in the dialogue is when Socrates tells Meno that there is no such thing as teaching, only recollection of knowledge from past lives, or anamnesis. Socrates claims that he can demonstrate this by showing that one of Meno's servants, a slave boy, knows geometric principles though he is uneducated. Socrates states that he will teach the boy nothing, only ask him questions to assist the process of recollection. Socrates proceeds to ask the slave boy a series of questions about the size and length of lines and squares, using visual diagrams to aid the boy in understanding the questions. The crucial point to this part of the dialogue is that, though the boy has no training, he knows the correct answers to the questions – he intrinsically knows the Pythagorean proposition.

Innate knowledge

Shortly before the demonstration of Pythagoras' theorem, the dialogue takes an epistemological turn when the interlocutors begin to discuss the fundamental nature of knowledge. The general question asked is how one can claim to know something when one does not even know what knowledge is. Via the Socratic method, it is shown that the answer to the question posed is innateness – one possesses a priori knowledge.

This is derived from Socrates' belief that one's soul existed in past lives and knowledge is transferred from those lives to the current one. "These [ideas] were revealed in a former state of existence, and are recovered by reminiscence (anamnesis) or association from sensible things" . The claim is that one does not need to know what knowledge is before gaining knowledge, but rather one has a wealth of knowledge before ever gaining any experience.

Contemporary parallels
There is contemporary work related to the questions of accounting for the gap between experience and knowledge, explaining the sources of knowledge, and how much knowledge is possessed prior to experience or without conscious awareness. In particular, many areas in contemporary linguistics and psychological research have relevance to these epistemological questions. Linguistic analysis has provided some evidence for innate cognitive capacities for language, and there are many areas of cognitive psychology that yield data from investigations into sources of knowledge. In addition, some claims in the Meno have connections to current research on perception and long-term memory (LTM).

Linguistics

Linguistics is the scientific study of language. Chomskyan linguistics (an inclusive, though perhaps informal, label for the theories and methodologies of linguistic study spearheaded by Noam Chomsky, meant to encompass his extensive work and influence in the field) includes everything from Chomsky's earliest work in transformational grammar to more recent work in the Minimalist Program. More exactly, it is the study of the structure of language, or grammar. Chomskyan linguistics is defined by a particular theoretical foundation and methodological approach that sets it apart from other linguistic perspectives, such as those described by functional grammar or structuralism (per Leonard Bloomfield) for example. This particular approach to the study of language is also often referred to as Generative linguistics, which is attributed to Chomsky and his early generative grammar work.

Universal grammar
There are several concepts important to the Chomskyan (or generativist) approach to linguistics. The most fundamental of these ideas is the theory of universal grammar (UG). Simply put, and as implied by the name, UG refers to those grammatical properties thought to be shared by all (to be universal to all) derivations of human language (anything from Amharic to Zhuang).

Per this conceptualization, UG is innate to all humans – people come "pre-wired" with this universal grammatical structure. A person's individual grammar (that which is unique to the person) develops from the interaction between the innate universal grammar and input from the environment, or primary linguistic data. This "analytic triplet" (McGilvray, ed., 2005, p. 51), UG + input = grammar, is the functional core of the theory.

Language acquisition
Several questions (or problems) motivate linguistic theorizing and investigation. Two such taken up in Chomskyan linguistics are the process of language acquisition in children, and "Plato's Problem". These subjects are interrelated and viewed as evidence in support of the theory of UG.

One of the simplest ways to approach the concept of universal grammar is to pose a hypothetical question about an aspect of language acquisition in children – why does a child learn the language that it does. As a specific example, how can a child of Asian descent (say, born of Chinese parents) be set down in the middle of Topeka, Kansas and acquire "perfect English?" The answer is that the child does not start with "Chinese", or any other conventionally defined language, in its head. The child does start with general grammatical rules that determine linguistic properties.

Children come equipped with universal grammar, from which any natural human language will develop – without instruction. All that is needed is passive input during the critical period—defined in linguistics as that period within which a child must have necessary and sufficient exposure to human language so that language acquisition occurs; without sufficient exposure to primary linguistic data, the UG does not have the necessary input for development of an individual grammar; this period is commonly recognized as spanning from birth to adolescence, generally up to the age of 12 years, though individual variations are possible. If what the child predominantly hears (or sees via sign) as it is maturing through this critical period is the English spoken in Topeka, Kansas, then that is what the child will acquire. This is why, regardless of a child's ethnic/racial background (or any other non-relevant factor, the child will know Cockney English, Egyptian Arabic, or isiZulu if the child's primary linguistic input is Cockney English, Egyptian Arabic, or isiZulu, respectively.

The hypothetical question posed addresses a common misconception about what is instantiated in the mind/brain of an individual when it comes to language. It does not address the "logical problem" of language acquisition, i.e., how children transition from ostensibly having no knowledge of language to having full knowledge, in what may be described as a very limited time with apparently limited input.

Plato's problem

To address the issue of apparently limited input, one must turn to what is possibly the most quoted of all arguments in support of universal grammar and its nativist interpretation – Plato's Problem. The phrase refers to the Socratic dialogue, the Meno; Noam Chomsky is often attributed with applying the term to the study of linguistics.

In Chomsky's 1986 book Knowledge of Language, the author begins with informal characterization of Plato's Problem as The problem of explaining how we can know so much given so little evidence, which is based on an early expression of Plato’s Problem by [Bertrand Russell]: "How comes it that human beings, whose contacts with the world are brief and personal and limited, are nevertheless able to know as much as they do know?" 

In The Cambridge Companion to Chomsky, David Lightfoot explains as follows:

 The problem arises in the domain of language acquisition in that children attain infinitely more than they experience. Literally so, we shall see: they attain a productive system, a grammar, on the basis of very little experience. So there is more, much more, to language acquisition than mimicking what we hear in childhood, and there is more to it than the simple transmission of a set of words and sentences from one generation of speakers to the next. There is more to it than a reproduction of experience and, in maturity, our capacity goes well beyond what we have experienced.

 Consider some subtleties that people are not consciously aware of. The verb is may be used in its full form or its reduced form: people say Kim is happy or Kim’s happy. However, certain instances of is never reduce, for example, the underlined items in Kim is happier than Tim is or I wonder what the problem is in Washington. Most people are not aware of this, but we all know subconsciously not to use the reduced form here. How did we come to this? The question arises because the eventual knowledge is richer than relevant experience. As children, we heard instances of the full form and the reduced form, but we were not instructed to avoid the reduced form in certain places; we had no access to "negative data," information about what does not occur.

Plato's Problem particularly refers to a point in the dialogue when Socrates is talking with an uneducated servant and shows, through this interaction, that the servant knows the Pythagorean Theorem though he has never been explicitly taught any geometry. How does the servant know without having ever been taught? Plato's suggestion is, essentially, that people have innate knowledge.

In the field of linguistics, Plato's Problem is the problem of finding an explanation for how a child acquires language though the child does not receive explicit instruction and the primary linguistic data a child does receive is limited. This PLD is the input, or stimuli, from the environment, necessary for the development of an individual's grammar – language – via input into UG. This limited environmental stimulus is referred to as poverty of the stimulus. Specifically, the stimuli to which children are exposed during the critical period do not encompass every lawful example of grammatical structure relevant to the particular language.

For instance, consider that a child might hear the following examples:

  Who do you think that Jack will kiss first?
  Who do you think      Jack will kiss first?

From this, the child might determine that the word that is optional and from this analogize to the following examples:

  Who do you think      will kiss Jill first?
 *Who do you think that will kiss Jill first?

Clearly, the second example is not a grammatically well-formed sentence in English. A child knows this and does not form sentences such as the one marked by the asterisk. How does the child know, without being explicitly taught, that the ungrammatical example is, in fact, ungrammatical? From the linguistic perspective being described here, the answer to this question is that such knowledge pre-exists as part of UG.

Plato's Problem describes the disparity between input (poverty of the stimulus) and output (grammar). As Plato suggests in the Meno dialogue, the bridge between input (whether limited or lacking) and output is innate knowledge. Poverty of the stimulus is crucial to the Platonic argument and it is a linchpin concept in Chomskyan linguistics. For this reason, Plato's Problem is often used synonymously to mean poverty of the stimulus. Specific to linguistics, the formulation of this problem is evidence for the existence of universal grammar. Plato's Problem, as conceived here, informs much of the theory in this branch of linguistics.

Perception and attention
There have been studies of perception and attention that support the idea that there is an abundance of knowledge available to an individual at any given moment (Blake & Sekuler, 2006).

Visual
A key ingredient to the beginning stages of perception requires the attention of the observer on some focal point or stimulus. There is a presupposition that if one visually perceives an object, one knows that one is seeing it (excluding the exception of perceptual illusions). Whatever sensory stimuli are attended to can be declared knowledge.

Stimuli that are directly attended to are projected onto the fovea, the central point of the retina that corresponds to the focal point in visual space. To the immediate left and right of the focal point is the portion of visual space attributed to binocular vision. The far left and right of one's visual space is attributed to the monocular vision of the left and right eyes. In sum, one's visual space covers roughly 200° from the periphery of the left eye to the periphery of the right eye. This large visual space in human beings is a result of a fully developed and functioning anatomical visual system. In the context of Plato's Problem, our visual system is an innate capacity that enables us to be aware of a considerable portion of our immediate environment which enhances our conscious experience by supplementing it with an extensive environmental awareness and predisposing us to extract meaningful perceptual information. In other words, it is our biologically produced visual system that makes our perceptual experiences meaningful.

Auditory
Some examples from auditory perception research will be helpful in explaining the fact that our perceptual faculties naturally enhance and supplement our conscious experience. First, there is the "cocktail party phenomenon" (Moray, 1959). When someone is engaged in conversation with a group of people in a noisy room, but then they suddenly hear something or hear their name from across the room, when they were completely inattentive to the input before, that is the cocktail party phenomenon. This phenomenon also occurs with words associated with danger and sex. Although people may be inattentive to a portion of their environment, when they hear specific "trigger" words, their auditory capacities are redirected to another dimension of perceptual awareness. This shows that we do process information outside of our immediate conscious experience. Similar to visual perception, auditory perception also enhances and supplements our experience by searching out and extracting meaningful information from our environment.

The auditory findings are further concretized by research on shadowing tasks (Cherry, 1966). These tasks involve two distinct auditory messages presented simultaneously to both ears. One message in one ear is supposed to be shadowed (repeated) while the other message in the other ear is supposed to be ignored. Participants generally perform well at repeating familiar messages in the attended channel. However, when there was a significant change in frequency in the message in the unattended channel, it was detected; moreover, when their names were presented in the unattended channel, they noticed that as well. These shadowing tasks reinforce the idea that the gap between knowledge and experience is explained by our innate perceptual capacities that enhance our experience and optimize our knowledge gained from our environment.

Subliminal priming
There is also the subject of subliminal priming (Nisbett & Ross, 1980), in which a stimulus is perceived outside of conscious awareness.  For example, in an experiment, half of a class was presented with a picture of a boy holding a birthday cake, while the other half was presented with a different picture of the same boy holding a birthday cake. The sole difference between the two was that in the first picture the boy had a mischievous facial expression, while in the second he conveyed an innocent smile. The photos were presented in a flash of 100 ms, then another picture was presented to both groups with the boy smiling. Results were that the first group described him as devilish and naughty, and the second group depicted him as angelic and kind. Due to the short presentation of the pictures, the subjects were not consciously aware of the nature of the original photos and when presented with them afterwards, participants were surprised.

These studies point to the fact that even though we only attend to and process limited information, we have a vast amount of knowledge at our disposal through our highly unrestricted sensory registers. It is the selective attention, perception, and higher order cognitive processing that limits these inputs and it is precisely these processes that make up our conscious awareness. Thus, in order to formulate some explanations for Plato's Problem, our conscious awareness limits our experience; nevertheless, it seems as though some stimuli that are sensed by our sensory registers, although seemingly rejected by conscious awareness, are actually retained and abstracted into our memories for further processing. All of our fully functioning perceptual faculties enhance, supplement, and optimize our experiences.

Long-term memory (LTM)

This LTM availability/accessibility dichotomy is analogous to a more contemporary explanation of Plato's doctrine of reminiscence, which postulates that an individual hedge as a result of information carried over from past lives. While evidence for or against immortality is outside the bounds of scientific research, one can see similarities between LTM availability/accessibility and the doctrine of reminiscence. LTM availability is highly unrestricted and practically unlimited as a storage system while LTM accessibility corresponds to what we can actually recall at any given moment. Plato, through his doctrine of reminiscence, would say that knowledge available through reminiscence is practically unrestricted but we are not cognizant of many of those ideas because they have yet to be recalled.

Implications
Various implications arise from the research and theorizing on Plato's philosophy, linguistics, perception, and cognitive structures. Debates over epistemology have been around since antiquity. In historical philosophy, the debate has been between rationalism and empiricism. In contemporary psychology, the debate is between biology (nature) and environment (nurture).

Rationalism is a philosophical and epistemological perspective on knowledge that claims, at its most extreme, that reason is the only dependable source of knowledge; moreover, rationalists assert that a priori knowledge is the most effective foundation for knowledge . Empiricism, on the other hand, argues that no knowledge exists prior to experience; therefore, all knowledge, as well as thought, comes from experience. The nature and nurture debate is not identical, and yet has parallels to the rationalism versus empiricism debate. Those who claim that thought and behavior result from nature say the cause is genetic predisposition while those who argue for environment say that thought and behavior are caused by learning, parenting, and socialization.

In contemporary philosophical, linguistic, and psychological circles, it is rare to maintain an unwavering stance on either of these extremes; most fall toward the middle. The ideas of "nature and nurture" or "innateness and environmental input" are no longer perceived as mutually exclusive. Instead, researchers point to a necessarily interactive relationship in order for thought and behavior to occur.

In Plato's philosophy, innate ideas are revealed through the Socratic Method of investigation. In linguistics, universal grammar must have input from the environment (primary linguistic data) in order for children to achieve an individual grammar (output). Biologically, our perceptual faculties are pre-wired, but they require environmental stimuli in order to develop correctly. The neurological structures in our brain that represent the location of LTM are also biologically pre-wired, yet environmental input is needed in order for memory to flourish.

All of these ideas speak to the crux of Plato's Problem, which is how to account for the gap between knowledge and limited experience. For some scientific and philosophical disciplines, the answer to this conundrum is innateness, or biological pre-wiring. Innate knowledge is what bridges the gap between the limited information one gleans from the environment (poverty of the stimulus) and one's actual knowledge.

References

Further reading

 Blake, Randolph, and Robert Sekuler. Perception. 5th ed. New York, NY: McGraw-Hill, 2006.
 Bruner, J. S., & Kenney, H. J. (1965). Representation and mathematics learning. In L. N. Morrisett and J. Vinsonhaler (Eds.), Mathematical learning. Monographs of the Society for Research in Child Development, 30 (Serial No. 99).
 Carnie, Andrew. Syntax. Oxford: Blackwell, 2002.
 Cherry, C. (1966). On human communication. (2nd ed.). Cambridge, MA: The MIT Press.
 Chomsky, Noam. Modular Approaches to the Study of the Mind. San Diego: San Diego State University Press, 1984.
 Dresher, Elan. Language and Mind Forum. 2000. Ahmanson Foundation. 15 Mar. 2006 <http://www.usc.edu/dept/LAS/linguistics/langmind.htm#dresher>
 Kemerling, Garth. A Dictionary of Philosophical Terms and Names. 2002. 11 Apr. 2006. <http://www.philosophypages.com/dy/index.htm>
 Mayer, Richard E. Thinking, Problem Solving, Cognition. 2nd ed. New York, NY: W. H. Freeman and Company, 1991.
 McGilvray, James, ed. The Cambridge Companion to Chomsky. Cambridge: Cambridge University Press, 2005.
 Meno:Introduction. 2004. Farlex, Inc. 15 Mar. 2006. <http://plato.thefreelibrary.com/Meno/1-1>
 Moray, N. (1959). Attention in dichotic listening: Affective cues and the influence of instructions. Quarterly Journal of Experimental Psychology, 11, 56–60.
 Nisbett, R. E., & Ross, L. (1980). Human preferences: Strategies and shortcomings of social	judgment. Englewood Cliffs, NJ: Prentice-Hall.
 Plato: (427 B.C. – 347 B.C.). 2004. Farlex, Inc. 15 Mar. 2006. <http://plato.thefreelibrary.com>
 Pojman, Louis P. Classics of Philosophy. 2nd ed. Oxford: Oxford UP, 2003.
 Russell, Bertrand. The History of Western Philosophy. New York, NY: Simon and Schuster, 1945.
 Solso, Robert L., M. Kimberly MacLin, and Otto H. MacLin. Cognitive Psychology. 7th ed. Boston, MA: Allyn and Bacon, 2005.

External links

Concepts in epistemology
Language acquisition
Generative linguistics
Philosophical problems